William R. "Pete" Johns (January 17, 1888 – August 9, 1964) was an infielder in Major League Baseball. He played for the Chicago White Sox and St. Louis Browns.

Johns died on August 9, 1964, and was buried at Knollwood Cemetery in Mayfield Heights, Ohio.

References

Bibliography

External links

1888 births
1964 deaths
Major League Baseball infielders
Chicago White Sox players
St. Louis Browns players
Baseball players from Cleveland
Newark Newks players
Lima Cigarmakers players
Ellsworth Blues players
Akron Champs players
Columbus Senators players
Akron Rubbermen players
Burials at Knollwood Cemetery